Casarotto is an Italian placename and Casarotti is an Italian surname. Notable people with the names include:

 Davide Casarotto (born 1971), former Italian cyclist
  (born 1911), Italian actor
 Gino Casarotti, Italian comic publisher, founder of 
 Giuseppe Casarotti, Italian comic publisher
  (born 1969), Italian manager

See also 
 Casarotto, Bergamo, village near Bergamo, Lombardy
 Casarotto, Verona, village near Verona, Veneto

Italian-language surnames
Toponymic surnames